Richard Laurence Millington Synge FRS FRSE FRIC FRSC MRIA (Liverpool, 28 October 1914 –  Norwich, 18 August 1994) was a British biochemist, and shared the 1952 Nobel Prize in Chemistry for the invention of partition chromatography with Archer Martin.

Life
Richard Laurence Millington Synge was born in West Kirby on 28 October 1914, the son of Lawrence Millington Synge, a Liverpool stock-broker, and his wife, Katherine C. Swan. 

Synge was educated at the Old Hall in Wellington, Shropshire and at Winchester College. He then studied Chemistry at Trinity College, Cambridge. 

He spent his entire career in research, at the Wool Industries Research Association, Leeds (1941–1943), Lister Institute for Preventive Medicine, London (1943–1948), Rowett Research Institute, Aberdeen (1948–1967), and Food Research Institute, Norwich (1967–1976).

It was during his time in Leeds that he worked with Archer Martin, developing partition chromatography, a technique used in the separation mixtures of similar chemicals, that revolutionised analytical chemistry. Between 1942 and 1948 he studied peptides of the protein group gramicidin, work later used by Frederick Sanger in determining the structure of insulin. In March 1950 he was elected a Fellow of the Royal Society for which his candidature citation read:

In 1963 he was elected a Fellow of the Royal Society of Edinburgh. His proposers were Magnus Pyke, Andrew Phillipson, Sir David Cuthbertson and John Andrew Crichton.

He was for several years the treasurer of the Chemical Information Group of the Royal Society of Chemistry, and was an honorary Professor in Biological Sciences at the University of East Anglia from 1968 to 1984. He was awarded an honorary Doctor of Science (ScD) from the University of East Anglia in 1977, and an honorary doctorate from the Faculty of Mathematics and Science at Uppsala University, Sweden in 1980.

Personal life
In 1943 Synge married Ann Davies Stephen (1916–1997). Ann Stephen was the daughter of psychologist Karin Stephen and psychoanalyst Adrian Stephen.  Ann's sister Judith (1918-1972) was married to documentary artist and photographer Nigel Henderson.

References

External links
 
 Synge's Nobel Lecture Applications of Partition Chromatography

1914 births
1994 deaths
People educated at Winchester College
Alumni of Trinity College, Cambridge
British biochemists
Nobel laureates in Chemistry
British Nobel laureates
Scientists from Liverpool
Academics of the University of East Anglia
Fellows of the Royal Society
English Nobel laureates